La Minerve is a village and municipality in the Laurentides region of Quebec, Canada, part of the Les Laurentides Regional County Municipality.

Located in the Laurentian Mountains, La Minerve is still fairly forested and covered with many lakes, notably Chapleau, Désert, and La Minerve Lakes. Its southern portion is part of the Papineau-Labelle Wildlife Reserve. The area is popular for cottage vacationing. In the summer, the small local population swells with nearly 15,000 tourists.

History
Before the arrival of missionary colonizer Antoine Labelle, journalists of the Montreal newspaper "La Minerve" explored this region between 1880 and 1885. At that time, the Club Island  was known as "Governor Island" and belonged to Sir Joseph-Adolphe Chapleau, controller of the newspaper. Afterwards, employees of La Minerve began to strongly encourage the settlement of the area which came to be named after this newspaper. The 30 January 1886 edition of La Minerve reported:

During the years 1880 to 1890, the government granted the first land concessions. The first settler, Isaac Grégoire, arrived in 1885, and in the fall of the same year, notary Joseph Lefebvre, from Waterloo in the Eastern Townships, and some of his friends came to the area taking possession of some lots in La Minerve. Lefebvre opened a flour mill and a sawmill on the shores of Lake Desert.

In 1892, the Township of La Minerve and its township municipality were formed. In 1896, the post office opened, named Minerve (but renamed to La Minerve in 1949). In 1897, there were  under cultivation, 13 houses, 4 barns, 40 arpents of fencing (about 2.34 km). Twenty years later in 1917, there were 125 families with a total of 677 inhabitants.

In 1998, the Township Municipality of La Minerve obtained a new legal status and became the Municipality of La Minerve.

Demographics

Population

Population trend:
 Population in 2021: 1,421 (2016 to 2021 population change: 17.9%)
 Population in 2016: 1,205 
 Population in 2011: 1,234 
 Population in 2006: 1,295
 Population in 2001: 1,080
 Population in 1996: 927 (or 912 when adjusted for 2001 boundaries)
 Population in 1991: 880

Private dwellings occupied by usual residents: 767 (total dwellings: 1,638)

Mother tongue:
 English as first language: 5.3%
 French as first language: 91.2%
 English and French as first language: 1.4%
 Other as first language: 1.4%

Education

Sainte Agathe Academy (of the Sir Wilfrid Laurier School Board) in Sainte-Agathe-des-Monts serves English-speaking students in this community for both elementary and secondary levels.

References

Incorporated places in Laurentides
Municipalities in Quebec